Émile Marius Gardetto (24 April 1907 – 25 March 1980) was a Monegasque rower. He competed in the men's coxed four event at the 1928 Summer Olympics.

References

External links
 
 

1907 births
1980 deaths
Monegasque male rowers
Olympic rowers of Monaco
Rowers at the 1928 Summer Olympics